The , also known as the Gihae Expedition, was a 1419 invasion from Joseon against wokou (Japanese pirate) bases on Tsushima Island, which is located in the middle of the Tsushima Strait between the Korean Peninsula and Kyushu.

The Japanese identifying phrase derives from the Ōei era (1394–1428), which is the Japanese era name of the calendar system in use in Japan.  The corollary Korean identifying title derives from Gihae in the Chinese sexagenary cycle of the calendar system then in use in Joseon. In both, the terms are explicit equivalents for the Gregorian calendar year of 1419.

Background
From about 1400, despite its incorporation into the Japanese political order (this incorporation was however limited, to the point that Japanese authorities, regional and national, were unable throughout most of Japanese history to control and limit wokou activity originating in this area) before the Goryeo, Tsushima were located on the front lines that defended Japanese territory for much of its history. Historically, a large part of Tsushima's economy was sustained by trade with Korea; it was used as a "frontier territory" and a diplomatic meeting place between Korea and Japan, but was considered historically by Koreans as a vassal or dependent state of Korea, and despite a variety of changes in terminology over the ages designed to indicate its status as being in the Japanese sphere of influence, it was considered by many Koreans to be Korean land under foreign occupation.

From the end of the Goryeo through the early Joseon, the coastal regions of Korea, their populations, and their resources were often the objective of wokou raids.

In 1389, General Pak Wi of Goryeo cleared the island of wokou, he burnt 300 ships and rescued more than 100 Korean captives. The Joseon ordered a strengthening of Korean naval defenses, a strategic response to the constant threat posed by the pirates. In 1396, Korean official Kim Sa-hyeong (김사형, 金士衡) led a campaign into Tsushima.

Joseon subsequently asked the Ashikaga shogunate and its deputy in Kyūshū to suppress pirate activity, favoring legitimate traders. In exchange for certain privileges, it gave authority to Sō Sadashige, the de facto ruler of Tsushima Province, over ships sailing from Japan to Korea. When Sō Sadashige died in 1418, power was seized from Sadashige's infant son Sadamori (Tsutsukumaru) by Soda Saemontaro, a powerful wokou leader. Suffering from famine, wokou on Tsushima invaded Ming China in 1419. On the way to China, they invaded Korea's Bi-in and Haeju counties after their demands for food were rejected.

After receiving reports of these incidents, the Korean court approved an expedition of Tsushima. King Taejong, who had abdicated his throne in 1418 but was still a military adviser of Sejong the Great, favored a more offensive approach. On June 9, 1419, Taejong declared a war against Tsushima, citing that it belonged to Joseon, and Yi Jongmu was chosen to conduct the expedition.

Invasion
The Koreans waited until a large Japanese fleet had left the island for a raid. Yi Jong-mu's fleet of 227 ships and 17,285 soldiers set off from Geoje Island toward Tsushima on June 19, 1419. The following day the fleet landed in Asō Bay (浅茅湾).

General Yi Jong-mu first sent captured Japanese pirates as emissaries to ask for surrender. When he received no reply, he sent out expeditionary forces, and the soldiers proceeded to raid the islanders and pirates and plunder pirate settlements. According to "Veritable Records of the Joseon Dynasty" a Korean history book, in the battle of June 20, the Korean army captured 129 wokou ships, burned 1939 houses, killed 114 people, captured 21 people, and rescued 131 Chinese who were captured by the wokou. On June 29, the Joseon expeditionary forces "set fire to sixty-eight houses belonging to the pirates, burned fifteen vessels belonging to the pirates, beheaded nine pirates, and obtained fifteen Chinese men and women and eight Joseon people [who had been held in captivity]." In the record of July 10, the number of soldiers killed by wokou was rectified to 180. According to the Taishuu Chronenryaku, which was a Japanese source compiled later, the death toll of the Korean army was 2500.

In the weeks that followed, a truce was negotiated with the Sō clan on the island. The Korean expeditionary force withdrew and sailed back to the Korean Peninsula on July 3, 1419. In subsequent diplomatic exchanges, Tsushima would be granted trading privileges with Joseon, in exchange for maintaining control and order of pirate threats originating from the island.

Aftermath
The activities of wokou declined after this invasion. 24 years later in 1443 the Treaty of Gyehae would be negotiated between Joseon and the Sō clan in which the Joseon government agreed to grant the Sō clan limited trading privileges and access to three coastal Korean ports, under the condition that the Sō clan control and stop any coastal pirate raids. After the conclusion of this treaty the activities of wokou were further suppressed. The number of trade ships from Tsushima to Korea was decided by this treaty (50 ships a year), and the Sō clan monopolized the trade with Korea.

In 1510, Japanese traders initiated an uprising against Joseon's stricter policies on Japanese traders from Tsushima and Iki coming to Busan, Ulsan and Jinhae to trade. The Sō Clan supported the uprising, but it was eventually suppressed by local authorities. The uprising was later came to be known as the "Disturbance of the Three Ports".

A more restrictive treaty was re-imposed under the direction of King Jungjong in 1512, but this Treaty of Imsin was enacted only under strictly limited terms, and only twenty-five ships were allowed to visit Joseon annually until "Japanese riots in Saryangjin" (사량진왜변, 蛇梁鎭倭變) in 1544.

Korean exports included rice,  cotton, ginseng, and Sutra texts. In exchange, the Sō clan provided copper, tin, sulfur, medicinal herbs, and spices from both Tsushima island and Japan. The Sō clan became a trading hub between Korea and Japan and benefited greatly from it.

The relationship between Korea and residents of Tsushima Island greatly improved thereafter; there were numerous records of hospitality towards shipwrecked Korean sailors who ended up on the island, and merchants from Tsushima Island enjoyed special privileges in Korean ports.

Aftermath according to Japanese sources
In Kyoto, rumors of the invasion spread around the end of the 6th month. The raid was associated with the Mongol invasions of Japan. Between the 7th and 8th month, Shōni Mitsusada, the overlord of the Sō clan, reported to the Ashikaga shogunate that the Shōni's deputy Sō Uemon had defeated Korean invaders. However, Korean captives were reported to have stated that forces from Ming China were planning to invade Japan. Since shōgun Ashikaga Yoshimochi took a harder stance toward the Ming than his father Yoshimitsu, the threat was taken seriously by the shogunate. Later, the shōgun received a report from the Kyūshū Deputy. Since it was considerably different from the Shōni's version, the shōgun felt the necessity of examining Korea's real intentions.

In a letter to Sō Sadamori issued on the 15th of the 7th month, the Joseon claimed that Tsushima belonged to Gyeongsang Province and asked him to leave the island, either by coming to the Korean Peninsula or by retreating to mainland Japan. In the 9th month, a man who claimed to be an envoy of Sō Sadamori arrived in Korea. The conditions he presented seemed unsatisfactory to the Joseon. Taejong made similar demands of the envoy in the 10th month. According to the article on the 10th day of the first leap month of 1420 of Sejong Sillok, the same self-claimed envoy agreed to Korea's proposal to put Tsushima under the rule of Gyeongsang Province. On the 23rd of that month, the Korean court approved of this agreement. However, in later negotiations it was revealed that the envoy was not actually a representative of Sō Sadamori.

In the 11th month of 1419, envoys of Ashikaga Yoshimochi visited Korea. In return, King Sejong sent Song Hui-gyeong to Japan.

The diplomatic mission left the Joseon capital on the 15th day of the first leap month of 1420. The envoy continued on from Busan on the 15th day of the 2nd month. On the 21st, he met Soda Saemontaro on Tsushima as Sō Sadamori stayed with the Shōni clan in Hizen Province. He arrived in Kyoto in the 4th month. Having accomplished his mission, he left Kyoto in the 6th month, returning to Korea after completing negotiations with the Shōni and Sō clans in Kyūshū. He arrived in the capital in the 10th month, 1420.

This trip corrected mutual misunderstandings between Japan and Korea. In Tsushima, Song received a protest from Soda Saemontaro over a Korean document that stated Tsushima's dependence on Korea. He warned of the Shōni clan's possible military action. Song realized that Sō Sadamori had not been involved in the previous negotiations, and also learned of the Sō clan's vassalage to the Shōni clan. These realizations overturned Korea's plans towards Tsushima. In Kyoto, Song clarified that the Joseon had no intention of invading Japan. On their way back, Korean envoys faced the Sō and Shōni's hard-line attitude toward the Joseon.

In the 4th month of 1421, a letter under the name of Sō Sadamori demanded the return of Japanese captives and pointed out Korea's claim over Tsushima. It is noted that the Japanese envoy took advantage of the shogunate's authority, which can frequently be found in the Sō clan's later diplomatic talks with Korea. By the order of Taejong, Korea took a tough stance against the Sō clan. Although Soda's messengers visited Korea several times, they did not reach a settlement until 1423. The death of the hard-line Taejong in the 5th month of 1422 softened Korea's policy toward Japan. Under Sejong, Joseon relinquished its claims to Tsushima and decided to grant trade privileges to the Sō clan in exchange for its duty to maintain trade order.

Aftermath according to Korean sources
In 1419, King Sejong, under the advice of his father and former king Taejong, decided to attack the enemy at Tsushima while the pirates were engaged in conflict with China. In the May 1419, notice of this plan was sent as an ultimatum to the Tsushima province authorities. In the war declaration against Tsushima government, the King claimed Tsushima, known as Daemado in Korean, had degraded due to the lack of interference on pirate activities by the local authority. Korea repeated necessary involvement in the island's operations, by aiding in the recent famine and general trade route policing led the ruler to declare the land would be reclaimed by force in order to protect the integrity of the region.

During the conflicts, 180 Korean soldiers were killed.

In the July 1419, King Taejo sent a letter to Tsushima's Sō Sadamori laying claim to the historical repossession of Daemado (Tsushima) due to the Korean victory in war. Once again the land was Korean territory as it had been under the Kingdom of Silla. An arrangement was proposed for Tsushima to enter into a tributary relationship. In the 9th month of 1419 Sadamori sent an emissary to surrender the territory and to present a variety of tribute to the Korean court. In January 1420, a Japanese envoy visiting Seoul requested to have a copy of Tripitaka Koreana, a comprehensive Buddhist script held in great regard as a Korean national treasure. King Sejong granted the request as sign of friendship between two countries. In the 1st leap month of 1420 Sadamori requested that the island officially become a state of Korea under the name of Daemado, also promising to personally become a subject and to manage the Wokou situation as an independent act of the state. King Sejong granted this request as well as allowing Sadamori to report to Gyeongsang province rather than Seoul.

See also
History of Japan
Naval history of Japan
History of Korea
Naval history of Korea
Treaty of Gyehae
Japanese riots in Southeast Korea (1510)

References

External links
The annals of the Choson Dynasty
 KoreanDB, alternative 
 100.nate
 Monthly Chosun
 Koreaweb studies
 Japanese boat people

1410s in Japan
1419 in Asia
15th century in Korea
Wars involving Japan
Wars involving Joseon
Joseon dynasty
Invasions of Japan
Anti-Japanese sentiment in Korea
Anti-Korean sentiment in Japan
Conflicts in 1419
Japan–Korea relations